Rafflesia pricei is a parasitic flowering plant endemic to Borneo. It is named after amateur botanist William Price, who discovered the species on Mount Kinabalu in the 1960s.

References

External links
 Parasitic Plant Connection: Rafflesia pricei page

pricei
Parasitic plants
Endemic flora of Borneo
Flora of Sabah
Flora of Mount Kinabalu